The following is the qualification system and qualified countries for the Fencing at the 2019 Pan American Games competitions.

Qualification system
A total of 156 fencers will qualify to compete. Each nation may enter a maximum of 18 athletes (nine per gender). The top seven teams at the 2018 Pan American Championships, along with the top two individuals not qualified through the team event will qualify for each respective discipline per gender. The host nation, Peru, automatically qualifies the maximum number of fencers (18). A maximum of two athletes from one NOC can enter the individual events.

Qualification timeline

Qualification summary
A total of 15 countries qualified fencers.

Men

Épée

Foil

Sabre

Women

Épée

Foil

Sabre

References

P
Qualification for the 2019 Pan American Games
Fencing at the 2019 Pan American Games